The expression military–industrial complex (MIC) describes the relationship between a country's military and the defense industry that supplies it, seen together as a vested interest which influences public policy. A driving factor behind the relationship between the military and the defense-minded corporations is that both sides benefit—one side from obtaining war weapons, and the other from being paid to supply them. The term is most often used in reference to the system behind the armed forces of the United States, where the relationship is most prevalent due to close links among defense contractors, the Pentagon, and politicians. The expression gained popularity after a warning of the relationship's detrimental effects, in the farewell address of President Dwight D. Eisenhower on January 17, 1961.

In the context of the United States, the appellation is sometimes extended to military–industrial–congressional complex (MICC), adding the U.S. Congress to form a three-sided relationship termed an "iron triangle". Its three legs include political contributions, political approval for military spending, lobbying to support bureaucracies, and oversight of the industry; or more broadly, the entire network of contracts and flows of money and resources among individuals as well as corporations and institutions of the defense contractors, private military contractors, the Pentagon, Congress, and the executive branch.

Etymology 

President of the United States (and five-star general since World War II) Dwight D. Eisenhower used the term in his Farewell Address to the Nation on January 17, 1961:

The phrase was thought to have been "war-based" industrial complex before becoming "military" in later drafts of Eisenhower's speech, a claim passed on only by oral history. Geoffrey Perret, in his biography of Eisenhower, claims that, in one draft of the speech, the phrase was "military–industrial–congressional complex", indicating the essential role that the United States Congress plays in the propagation of the military industry, but the word "congressional" was dropped from the final version to appease the then-currently elected officials. James Ledbetter calls this a "stubborn misconception" not supported by any evidence; likewise a claim by Douglas Brinkley that it was originally "military–industrial–scientific complex". Additionally, Henry Giroux claims that it was originally "military–industrial–academic complex". The actual authors of the speech were Eisenhower's speechwriters Ralph E. Williams and Malcolm Moos.

Attempts to conceptualize something similar to a modern "military–industrial complex" existed before Eisenhower's address. Ledbetter finds the precise term used in 1947 in close to its later meaning in an article in Foreign Affairs by Winfield W. Riefler. In 1956, sociologist C. Wright Mills had claimed in his book The Power Elite that a class of military, business, and political leaders, driven by mutual interests, were the real leaders of the state, and were effectively beyond democratic control. Friedrich Hayek mentions in his 1944 book The Road to Serfdom the danger of a support of monopolistic organization of industry from World War II political remnants:

Vietnam War–era activists, such as Seymour Melman, referred frequently to the concept, and use continued throughout the Cold War: George F. Kennan wrote in his preface to Norman Cousins's 1987 book The Pathology of Power, "Were the Soviet Union to sink tomorrow under the waters of the ocean, the American military–industrial complex would have to remain, substantially unchanged, until some other adversary could be invented. Anything else would be an unacceptable shock to the American economy."

In the late 1990s James Kurth asserted, "By the mid-1980s... the term had largely fallen out of public discussion." He went on to argue that "[w]hatever the power of arguments about the influence of the military–industrial complex on weapons procurement during the Cold War, they are much less relevant to the current era".

Contemporary students and critics of U.S. militarism continue to refer to and employ the term, however. For example, historian Chalmers Johnson uses words from the second, third, and fourth paragraphs quoted above from Eisenhower's address as an epigraph to Chapter Two ("The Roots of American Militarism") of a 2004 volume on this subject. P. W. Singer's book concerning private military companies illustrates contemporary ways in which industry, particularly an information-based one, still interacts with the U.S. federal and the Pentagon.

The expressions permanent war economy and war corporatism are related concepts that have also been used in association with this term. The term is also used to describe comparable collusion in other political entities such as the German Empire (prior to and through the first world war), Britain, France, and (post-Soviet) Russia.

Linguist and anarchist theorist Noam Chomsky has suggested that "military–industrial complex" is a misnomer because (as he considers it) the phenomenon in question "is not specifically military". He asserts, "There is no military–industrial complex: it's just the industrial system operating under one or another pretext (defense was a pretext for a long time)."

Post–Cold War 

At the end of the Cold War, American defense contractors bewailed what they called declining government weapons spending. They saw escalation of tensions, such as with Russia over Ukraine, as new opportunities for increased weapons sales, and have pushed the political system, both directly and through industry groups such as the National Defense Industrial Association, to spend more on military hardware. Pentagon contractor-funded American think tanks such as the Lexington Institute and the Atlantic Council have also demanded increased spending in view of the perceived Russian threat. Independent Western observers such as William Huntzberger, director of the Arms & Security Project at the Center for International Policy, noted that "Russian saber-rattling has additional benefits for weapons makers because it has become a standard part of the argument for higher Pentagon spending—even though the Pentagon already has more than enough money to address any actual threat to the United States."

Eras 

Some sources divide the history of the military–industrial complex into three distinct eras.

First era 

From 1797 to 1941, the government only relied on civilian industries while the country was actually at war. The government owned their own shipyards and weapons manufacturing facilities which they relied on through World War I. With World War II came a massive shift in the way that the American government armed the military.

With the onset of World War II President Franklin D. Roosevelt established the War Production Board to coordinate civilian industries and shift them into wartime production. Throughout World War II arms production in the United States went from around one percent of the annual GDP to 40 percent of the GDP. Various American companies, such as Boeing and General Motors, maintained and expanded their defense divisions. These companies have gone on to develop various technologies that have improved civilian life as well, such as night-vision goggles and GPS.

Second era 

The second era is identified as beginning with the coining of the term by President Dwight D. Eisenhower. This era continued through the Cold War period, up to the end of the Warsaw Pact and the collapse of the Soviet Union. A 1965 article written by Marc Pilisuk and Thomas Hayden says benefits of the Military Industrial Complex of the United States include the advancement of the civilian technology market as civilian companies benefit from innovations from the MIC and vice versa. In 1993 the Pentagon urged defense contractors to consolidate due to the collapse of communism and shrinking defense budget.

Third (current) era 

In the third era, defense contractors either consolidated or shifted their focus to civilian innovation. From 1992 to 1997 there was a total of US$55 billion worth of mergers in the defense industry, with major defense companies purchasing smaller competitors.

In the current era, the military–industrial complex is seen as a core part of American policy-making. The American domestic economy is now tied directly to the success of the MIC which has led to concerns of repression as Cold War-era attitudes are still prevalent among the American public.

Shifts in values and the collapse of communism have ushered in a new era for the military–industrial complex. The Department of Defense works in coordination with traditional military–industrial complex aligned companies such as Lockheed Martin and Northrop Grumman. Many former defense contractors have shifted operations to the civilian market and sold off their defense departments.

Military subsidy theory 

According to the military subsidy theory, the Cold War-era mass production of aircraft benefited the civilian aircraft industry. The theory asserts that the technologies developed during the Cold War along with the financial backing of the military led to the dominance of American aviation companies. There is also strong evidence that the United States federal government intentionally paid a higher price for these innovations to serve as a subsidy for civilian aircraft advancement.

Current applications 

According to the Stockholm International Peace Research Institute, total world spending on military expenses in 2018 was $1822 billion. 36% of this total, roughly $649 billion, was spent by the United States. The privatization of the production and invention of military technology also leads to a complicated relationship with significant research and development of many technologies.
In 2011, the United States spent more (in absolute numbers) on its military than the next 13 countries combined.

The military budget of the United States for the 2009 fiscal year was $515.4 billion. Adding emergency discretionary spending and supplemental spending brings the sum to $651.2 billion. This does not include many military-related items that are outside of the Defense Department budget. Overall the U.S. federal government is spending about $1 trillion annually on defense-related purposes.

In a 2012 story, Salon reported, "Despite a decline in global arms sales in 2010 due to recessionary pressures, the United States increased its market share, accounting for a whopping 53 percent of the trade that year. Last year saw the United States on pace to deliver more than $46 billion in foreign arms sales." The defense industry also tends to contribute heavily to incumbent members of Congress.

Similar concepts 

A thesis similar to the military–industrial complex was originally expressed by Daniel Guérin, in his 1936 book Fascism and Big Business, about the fascist government ties to heavy industry. It can be defined as, "an informal and changing coalition of groups with vested psychological, moral, and material interests in the continuous development and maintenance of high levels of weaponry, in preservation of colonial markets and in military-strategic conceptions of internal affairs." An exhibit of the trend was made in Franz Leopold Neumann's book Behemoth: The Structure and Practice of National Socialism in 1942, a study of how Nazism came into a position of power in a democratic state.

Within decades of its inception, the idea of the military–industrial complex gave rise to other similar industrial complexes, including the animal–industrial complex, prison–industrial complex, pharmaceutical–industrial complex, entertainment-industrial complex, and medical–industrial complex. Virtually all institutions in sectors ranging from agriculture, medicine, entertainment, and media, to education, criminal justice, security, and transportation, began reconceiving and reconstructing in accordance with capitalist, industrial, and bureaucratic models with the aim of realizing profit, growth, and other imperatives. According to Steven Best, all these systems interrelate and reinforce one another.

The concept of the military–industrial complex has been also expanded to include the entertainment and creative industries as well. For an example in practice, Matthew Brummer describes Japan's Manga Military and how the Ministry of Defense uses popular culture and the moe that it engenders to shape domestic and international perceptions.

An alternative term to describe the interdependence between the military-industrial complex and the entertainment industry is coined by James Der Derian as "Military-Industrial-Media-Entertainment-Network".

See also 

 Literature and media
 War Is a Racket (1935 book by Smedley Butler)
 The Power Elite (1956 book by C. Wright Mills)
 Why We Fight (2005 documentary film by Eugene Jarecki)
 War Made Easy: How Presidents & Pundits Keep Spinning Us to Death (2007 documentary film)
 The Complex: How the Military Invades Our Everyday Lives (2008 book by Nick Turse)

References

Citations

Sources 

 DeGroot, Gerard J. Blighty: British Society in the Era of the Great War, 144, London & New York: Longman, 1996, 
 Eisenhower, Dwight D.  Public Papers of the Presidents, 1035–1040. 1960.
 Eisenhower, Dwight D.  "Farewell Address."  In The Annals of America.  Vol. 18.  1961–1968: The Burdens of World Power, 1–5.  Chicago: Encyclopædia Britannica, 1968.
 Eisenhower, Dwight D. [[s:Military–Industrial Complex Speech|President Eisenhower's Farewell Address]], Wikisource.
 Hartung, William D. "Eisenhower's Warning: The Military–Industrial Complex Forty Years Later." World Policy Journal 18, no. 1 (Spring 2001).
 Johnson, Chalmers The Sorrows of Empire: Militarism, Secrecy, and the End of the Republic, New York: Metropolitan Books, 2004
 Kurth, James.  "Military–Industrial Complex."  In The Oxford Companion to American Military History, ed. John Whiteclay Chambers II, 440–442.  Oxford: Oxford University Press, 1999.
 Nelson, Lars-Erik. "Military–Industrial Man." In New York Review of Books 47, no. 20 (Dec. 21, 2000): 6.
 Nieburg, H. L. In the Name of Science, Quadrangle Books, 1970
 Mills, C. Wright."Power Elite", New York, 1956

 Further reading 

 Adams, Gordon, The Iron Triangle: The Politics of Defense Contracting, 1981.
 Andreas, Joel, Addicted to War: Why the U.S. Can't Kick Militarism, .
 Cochran, Thomas B., William M. Arkin, Robert S. Norris, Milton M. Hoenig, U.S. Nuclear Warhead Production Harper and Row, 1987, 
 Cockburn, Andrew, "The Military-Industrial Virus:  How bloated budgets gut our defenses", Harper's Magazine, vol. 338, no. 2029 (June 2019), pp. 61–67.  "The military-industrial complex could be said to be concerned, exclusively, with self-preservation and expansion.... The defense budget is not propelled by foreign wars.  The wars are a consequence of the quest for bigger budgets."
 Cockburn, Andrew, "Why America Goes to War: Money drives the US military machine", The Nation, vol. 313, no. 6 (20–27 September 2021), pp. 24–27.
 Colby, Gerard, DuPont Dynasty, New York, Lyle Stuart, 1984.
 Friedman, George and Meredith, The Future of War: Power, Technology and American World Dominance in the 21st Century, Crown, 1996, 

 Hossein-Zadeh, Ismael, The Political Economy of US Militarism. New York: Palgrave MacMillan, 2006.
 Keller, William W., Arm in Arm: The Political Economy of the Global Arms Trade. New York: Basic Books, 1995.
 Kelly, Brian, Adventures in Porkland: How Washington Wastes Your Money and Why They Won't Stop, Villard, 1992, 
 Lassman, Thomas C. "Putting the Military Back into the History of the Military-Industrial Complex: The Management of Technological Innovation in the U.S. Army, 1945–1960," Isis (2015) 106#1 pp. 94–120 in JSTOR
 Mathews, Jessica T., "America's Indefensible Defense Budget", The New York Review of Books, vol. LXVI, no. 12 (18 July 2019), pp. 23–24.  "For many years, the United States has increasingly relied on military strength to achieve its foreign policy aims.... We are [...] allocating too large a portion of the federal budget to defense as compared to domestic needs [...] accumulating too much federal debt, and yet not acquiring a forward-looking, twenty-first-century military built around new cyber and space technologies."  (p. 24.)
 McCartney, James and Molly Sinclair McCartney, America's War Machine: Vested Interests, Endless Conflicts. New York: Thomas Dunne Books, 2015.
 McDougall, Walter A., ...The Heavens and the Earth: A Political History of the Space Age, Basic Books, 1985, (Pulitzer Prize for History) 
 Melman, Seymour, Pentagon Capitalism: The Political Economy of War, McGraw Hill, 1970
 Melman, Seymour, (ed.) The War Economy of the United States: Readings in Military Industry and Economy, New York: St. Martin's Press, 1971.
 Mills, C Wright, The Power Elite. New York, 1956.
 Mollenhoff, Clark R., The Pentagon: Politics, Profits and Plunder. New York: G.P. Putnam's Sons, 1967
 Patterson, Walter C., The Plutonium Business and the Spread of the Bomb, Sierra Club, 1984, 
 Pasztor, Andy, When the Pentagon Was for Sale: Inside America's Biggest Defense Scandal, Scribner, 1995, 
 Pierre, Andrew J., The Global Politics of Arms Sales. Princeton, NJ: Princeton University Press, 1982.
 
 Sampson, Anthony, The Arms Bazaar: From Lebanon to Lockheed. New York: Bantam Books, 1977.
 St. Clair, Jeffery, Grand Theft Pentagon: Tales of Corruption and Profiteering in the War on Terror. Common Courage Press, 2005.
 Sweetman, Bill, "In search of the Pentagon's billion dollar hidden budgets – how the US keeps its R&D spending under wraps", from Jane's International Defence Review, online
 Thorpe, Rebecca U. The American Warfare State: The Domestic Politics of Military Spending. Chicago: University of Chicago Press, 2014.
 Watry, David M., Diplomacy at the Brink, Eisenhower, Churchill, and Eden in the Cold War, Baton Rouge, Louisiana State University Press, 2014.
 Weinberger, Sharon, Imaginary Weapons, New York: Nation Books, 2006.

 External links 

 Khaki capitalism, The Economist, December 3, 2011
 Militaryindustrialcomplex.com, Features running daily, weekly and monthly defense spending totals plus Contract Archives section.
 C. Wright Mills, Structure of Power in American Society, British Journal of Sociology, Vol. 9. No. 1 1958
 Dwight David Eisenhower, Farewell Address On the military–industrial complex and the government–universities collusion – January 17, 1961
 Dwight D. Eisenhower, Farewell Address As delivered transcript and complete audio from AmericanRhetoric.com
 William McGaffin and Erwin Knoll, The military–industrial complex, An analysis of the phenomenon written in 1969
 The Cost of War & Today's Military Industrial Complex, National Public Radio, January 8, 2003.
 Human Rights First; Private Security Contractors at War: Ending the Culture of Impunity (2008)
 Fifty Years After Eisenhower's Farewell Address, A Look at the Military–Industrial Complex – video report by Democracy Now!''
 Online documents, Dwight D. Eisenhower Presidential Library
 50th Anniversary of Eisenhower's Farewell Address – Eisenhower Institute
 Part 1 – Anniversary Discussion of Eisenhower's Farewell Address – Gettysburg College
 Part 2 – Anniversary Discussion of Eisenhower's Farewell Address – Gettysburg College

 
Dwight D. Eisenhower
Military economics
Complex
Snowclones